Dawbon Township is located in the southeastern part of Yangon, Myanmar. The township comprises 14 wards, and shares borders with Thingangyun township in the north, Mingala Taungnyunt township in the west, Thaketa township in the east, and Pazundaung township in the south across the Pazundaung Creek. Dawbon is connected to downtown Yangon via the Maha Bandula Bridge.

The township has twelve primary schools, four middle schools and one high school.

Population 
Dawbon Township's population is over 75,000 with 51.2% of female residents and 48.8% of male residents as of 2014.

References

Townships of Yangon